Ouvrage Bambesch is a lesser work (petit ouvrage) of the Maginot Line.  Located in the Fortified Sector of Faulquemont, the ouvrage consists of three infantry blocks, and is located between petits ouvrages Kerfent and Einseling, facing Germany. Completed in 1932, it is located in the Bois de Bambesch. On 20 June 1940 during the Battle of France, Bambesch was attacked by German forces, whose artillery battered the position, which could not be effectively supported by its neighbors, into surrender. Since 1973, Bambesch has been operated as a museum and is open to the public.

Design and construction 
The site was surveyed by CORF (Commission d'Organisation des Régions Fortifiées), the Maginot Line's design and construction agency, and was approved for construction in October 1931. It was completed at a cost of 11 million francs by the contractor Borie of Paris. The petit ouvrage was planned for construction in two phases. The second phase was to add an 81mm mortar turret block and a separate entrance block.

Description 
Bambesch comprises three infantry blocks. The blocks are linked by deep underground galleries, which also provide space for barracks, utilities and ammunition storage.
Block 1: Infantry block with one automatic rifle cloche (GFM) and one retractable twin machine gun turret.
Block 2: Infantry block with one GFM cloches, one grenade launcher cloche (LG), one twin machine gun embrasure and one machine gun/anti-tank gun embrasure (JM/AC47). The GFM cloche has had the concrete blasted from around its base and is pocked by shellfire.
Block 3: Infantry/entry block with two GFM cloches, one twin machine gun embrasure and one JM/AC47 anti-tank gun embrasure.

Work for the unbuilt second phase included a separate entry blocks and an 81mm mortar turret block.

Casemates and shelters 

In addition to the connected combat blocks, a series of detached casemates and infantry shelters surround Bambesch, including
 Casemate de Bambiderstroff Nord: SIngle block with one JM/AC47 embrasure, one JM embrasure and one GFM-A/B cloche.
 Casemate de Bambiderstroff Sud: SIngle block with two mortar cloches and one GFM-A/B cloche.
 Casemate de Bambesch: Artillery casemate with two 75mm guns and one GFM cloche, located well to the rear.

Manning 
The 1940 manning of the ouvrage under the command of Captain Pastre comprised 102 men and 2 officers of the 156th Fortress Infantry Regiment. The units were under the umbrella of both the 3rd and 4th Armies, Army Group 2. The Casernement de Zimming provided peacetime above-ground barracks and support services to Kerfent and other positions in the area.

History 

See Fortified Sector of Faulquemont for a broader discussion of the Faulquemont sector of the Maginot Line.
On 20 June 1940, Bambesch was attacked by German long 88mm guns of the 167th Infantry Division.  Block 2 was attacked first, driving the defenders into the underground galleries. With further attacks on Block 3, the defenders risked entrapment and asphyxiation. Despite support from neighboring Kerfent, the attackers could not be dislodged, and after two hours of bombardment, the garrison surrendered.

The fort was stabilized after the war by military engineers and was acquired by the community of Bambiderstroff in 1972, mostly to use the work's well as a municipal water supply. The site was opened to the public on 31 August 1973 by the Association des Guides de Bambesch. The fortification's machinery and equipment have been preserved.

See also 
 List of all works on Maginot Line
 Siegfried Line
 Atlantic Wall
 Czechoslovak border fortifications

Notes

References

Bibliography 
Allcorn, William. The Maginot Line 1928-45. Oxford: Osprey Publishing, 2003. 
Degon, André; Zylberyng, Didier, La Ligne Maginot: Guide des Forts à Visiter, Editions Ouest-France, 2014.  
Kaufmann, J.E. and Kaufmann, H.W. Fortress France: The Maginot Line and French Defenses in World War II, Stackpole Books, 2006. 
Kaufmann, J.E., Kaufmann, H.W., Jancovič-Potočnik, A. and Lang, P. The Maginot Line: History and Guide, Pen and Sword, 2011. 
Mary, Jean-Yves; Hohnadel, Alain; Sicard, Jacques. Hommes et Ouvrages de la Ligne Maginot, Tome 1. Paris, Histoire & Collections, 2001.  
Mary, Jean-Yves; Hohnadel, Alain; Sicard, Jacques. Hommes et Ouvrages de la Ligne Maginot, Tome 2. Paris, Histoire & Collections, 2003.  
Mary, Jean-Yves; Hohnadel, Alain; Sicard, Jacques. Hommes et Ouvrages de la Ligne Maginot, Tome 3. Paris, Histoire & Collections, 2003.  
Mary, Jean-Yves; Hohnadel, Alain; Sicard, Jacques. Hommes et Ouvrages de la Ligne Maginot, Tome 5. Paris, Histoire & Collections, 2009.

External links 
 Bambesch site
 Ouvrage de Bambesch at Chemins de mémoire 
 Ouvrage de Bambesch at District Urbain de Faulquemont 
 Bambesch website
 Bambiderstroff tourism 
 Ouvrage du Bambesch at wikimaginot.eu 

BAMB
Maginot Line
World War II museums in France